McChesney is a surname. Notable people with the surname include:

 Bill McChesney (politician), American Democratic Party member of the Montana House of Representatives.
 Bill McChesney (athlete) (1959–1992), American long-distance runner
 Bob McChesney, American jazz and studio trombonist
 Bob McChesney (American football, born 1912) (1912–1986), American football player
 Bob McChesney (American football, born 1926) (1926–2002), American football player
 Ernest McChesney (1912–1991), American tenor who had an active singing career in operas musicals, and concerts
 H. D. McChesney (1895–1954), American football coach for Emporia State University
 Iain McChesney, Scottish football (soccer) player
 Matt McChesney (1981), American football guard for the Denver Broncos of the National Football League
 Michael McChesney (born 1955), American founding partner of Five Paces Ventures 
 Robert McChesney (disambiguation)
 William McChesney Martin, Jr. (1906–1998), American longest-serving Chairman of the United States Federal Reserve